Roberta Brown is the name of

 Roberta Brown (javelin thrower) (born 1947), American javelin thrower
 Roberta Brown (long-distance runner) (born 1963), British long-distance runner in 1979 IAAF World Cross Country Championships – Senior women's race
 Roberta Brown (swordmaster) (born 1965), American swordmaster and actress
 Roberta Brown, Miss Ireland 1982